Travellers Rest is an unincorporated community located in Owsley County, Kentucky, United States. Their post office closed in June 1964.

References

Unincorporated communities in Owsley County, Kentucky
Unincorporated communities in Kentucky